The High Rhine Railway is the Deutsche Bahn railway line from Basel to Singen. It was built by the Grand Duchy of Baden State Railways as part of the Baden Mainline which followed the Rhine upstream from Mannheim to Constance (Konstanz).

Whilst, with the exception of Schaffhausen station, the line is owned and operated throughout by Deutsche Bahn, it passes through Swiss territory within the city of Basel, and whilst crossing the canton of Schaffhausen between Erzingen and Bietingen. Schaffhausen station is jointly owned and run by Deutsche Bahn and the Swiss Federal Railways.

History

The High Rhine Railway was opened on 4 February 1856 from Basel Badischer Bahnhof to Bad Säckingen and extended to Waldshut on 30 October 1856. Construction then stopped for a while, but on 15 June 1863, the whole line to Constance was completed. Meanwhile, the Turgi–Koblenz–Waldshut railway was opened on 18 August 1859, connecting to the Swiss railway network across the Rhine at Koblenz.

It is noteworthy that the whole line—including the section on Swiss territory—was owned under treaty by Baden State Railways and still belongs to Deutsche Bahn. The 1852 treaty allows Switzerland to reclaim ownership of the section on Swiss territory on five year’s notice. Although this possibility was discussed after the First World War, it was never implemented. In the Second World War, cross-border traffic was severely limited and military traffic did not pass through Switzerland. In 1944/45, four pairs of passenger services each day ran all the way between Basel Bad Bf and Singen. In the timetable, however, it was expressly stated: "transit through the Canton of Schaffhausen only permitted with passport with exemption (visa)". Between 8 June 1945 and 1 August 1953 the German railway infrastructure in Switzerland was managed by a trust authority established by the Swiss Federal Council.

Since 1987, most of the route has been double-tracked; only the section between Waldshut and Beringen is single track. The section between Laufenburg and Murg was duplicated a few years ago. The line is electrified only between Schaffhausen and Constance.

The state of Baden-Württemberg and the Canton of Schaffhausen have been asked to fund electrification of the remaining non-electrified route between Basel Bad Bf and Schaffhausen. At present, however, electrification of the section between Schaffhausen and Erzingen first is being examined.

Operations 
The line between Basel and Schaffhausen is not electrified, whilst the rest of the line is electrified at  supplied by overhead line.

While up to the 1990s, express services ran from Basel as well as Freiburg to Lindau, with some continuing to Munich, the route is today served by Interregio-Express trains on the Basel–Singen and Basel–Ulm routes. A Regionalbahn service runs between Basel and Waldshut every hour, with most trains continuing to Lauchringen. During peak hour services between Basel and Waldshut run every half-hour. Between Singen and Schaffhausen during the day more than one train an hour operate, including an hourly Zürich S-Bahn line S22 service. Services run between the Black Forest Railway and Singen and Constance.

The section between Waldshut and Basel is mainly used by commuters in the industrial conurbation of Basel. The section of the line in the Canton of Schaffhausen in Switzerland, has its own services operated by the Swiss Federal Railways. The section between Schaffhausen and Singen, which was electrified in 1989 and connects the Gäubahn and the Swiss rail network and carries significant long-distance passenger and freight traffic. On the section between Singen and Constance, local services are operated by the German subsidiary of Swiss Federal Railways, while InterRegio Express services connect with Karlsruhe. Constance station is on the Swiss border.

Notes

References

External links 
 http://suedbadenbahn.de/_Hochrheinbahn/badischebahnfr.html
Images of the tunnel entrances

Railway lines in Baden-Württemberg
Railway lines in Switzerland
Buildings and structures in Waldshut (district)
Cross-border railway lines in Germany
Cross-border railway lines in Switzerland
Railway lines opened in 1856